Guy Paré (died 1206) was a French Cistercian, who became general of his order, Archbishop of Reims, and a Cardinal.

He was a papal legate to Germany. In 1204 he was made Archbishop by Pope Innocent III; this position also made him a pair de France. In 1205 Innocent conferred on him the privilege of consecrating the Kings of France.

He died in Liège of the plague, while engaged on a papal diplomatic mission. He is buried at Citeaux.

Notes

External links
 TO&C

1206 deaths
French Cistercians
Cistercian abbots general
Archbishops of Reims
13th-century French cardinals
Cardinal-bishops of Palestrina
External cardinals
Year of birth unknown
13th-century peers of France